Tricia Springstubb is best known as an American writer of children's and young adult literature. She has also received praise for her work published in literary quarterlies. As of November 2009, her most recent award is the Iowa Review Prize for fiction.

Her most recent book sold over 100,000 copies.

She is also a critic who writes for The Plain Dealer.

Writings Available Online 
Criticism for The Plain Dealer (Cleveland, Ohio)

Bibliography
Source: Google Books except where noted.
 Springstubb, T. (1980). My Minnie is a Jewel. United States: Carolrhoda Books.
 Springstubb, T. (1981). The Blueberry Troll. United States: Carolrhoda Books.
 Springstubb, T. (1981). Give and Take. United States: Little, Brown.
 Springstubb, T. (1982). The Moon on a String: A Novel. United States: Little, Brown.
 Springstubb, T. (1982). The Magic Guinea Pig. United States: W. Marrow.
 Springstubb, T. (1984). Which Way to the Nearest Wilderness?. United States: Little, Brown.
 Springstubb, T. (1987). Eunice Gottlieb and the Unwhitewashed Truth about Life. United States: Delacorte Press.
 Springstubb, T. (1988). Eunice (the Egg Salad) Gottlieb. United States: Delacorte Press.
 Springstubb, T. (1989). With a Name Like Lulu, who Needs More Trouble?. Bulgaria: Delacorte Press.
 Springstubb, T. (1989). Why Can't Life be a Piece of Cake?. United Kingdom: HarperCollins Publishers Limited.
 Springstubb, T. (1990). Lulu Vs. Love. United States: Delacorte Press.
 Springstubb, T. (1991). Two Plus One Makes Trouble. United States: Scholastic. 
 Springstubb, T. (1993). Cleveland for Kids. United States: Cleveland Arts Consortium.
 Springstubb, T. (1993). Pet Sitters Plus Five. United States: Little Apple. 
 Springstubb, T. (1995). Two Plus One Goes A.P.E.. United States: Scholastic.
 Springstubb, T. (2002). The Vietnamese Americans. United States: Lucent Books.
 Springstubb, T. (2010). What Happened on Fox Street. United States: Balzer + Bray.
 Springstubb, T., Sudyka, D. (2016). Every Single Second. United States: Balzer + Bray.
 Springstubb, T. (2011). Mo Wren, Lost and Found. United States: HarperCollins.
 Springstubb, T. (2013). Phoebe and Digger. United States: Candlewick Press.
 Springstubb, T. (2015). Moonpenny Island. United States: Balzer + Bray.
 Springstubb, T. (2015). Cody and the Fountain of Happiness. United States: Candlewick Press.
 Springstubb, T. (2017). Cody and the Mysteries of the Universe. United States: Candlewick Press.
 Springstubb, T. (2017). Cody and the Rules of Life. United States: Candlewick Press.
 Springstubb, T. (2018). Cody and the Heart of a Champion. United States: Candlewick Press
 Springstubb, T. (2020). Khalil and Mr. Hagerty and the Backyard Treasures. United States: Candlewick Press.
 Springstubb, T. (expected June 2021) The Most Perfect Thing in the Universe. United States: Margaret Ferguson Books.

References

Living people
American children's writers
Year of birth missing (living people)